Souad Oulhaj (born June 12, 1974) is a Moroccan football referee.

She officiated in her first international match in 2005, before going on to participate in the 2005 Algarve Cup, 2006 Women's African Football Championship and the 2006 FIFA U-20 Women's World Championship in Russia.

Oulhaj was selected as one of the 36 match officials for the 2007 FIFA Women's World Cup in China.

References

1974 births
Moroccan football referees
Women association football referees
FIFA Women's World Cup referees
Living people